Cegereal, frequently styled CeGeREAL, is a real estate management company based in Paris, France.  It is a member of the CAC Small 90.

References

External links 
 Corporate website (fr)
 Profile on Google Finance

Real estate companies of France